Lucélia is a municipality in the state of São Paulo in Brazil. The population is 21,886 (2020 est.) in an area of 315 km². The elevation is 438 m.

References

Municipalities in São Paulo (state)